Toichleach Ua Gadhra, King of Gailenga, in medieval Ireland, died in 964.

Toichleach was a grandson of Gadhra, from whom the surname O'Gara derived. He may have been a son of Domhnall mac Gadhra, King of Gailenga, who was killed in 931.

The Annals of the Four Masters, sub anno 964, state that "A victory was gained by Comhaltan Ua Cleirigh, i.e. lord of Uí Fiachrach Aidhne, and by Maelseachlainn, son of Arcda, over Fergal Ua Ruairc, where seven hundred were lost, together with Toichleach Ua Gadhra, lord of South Luighne."

References
 The History of the County of Mayo to the Close of the Sixteenth Century. With illustrations and three maps, Hubert T. Knox. Originally published 1908, Hogges Figgies and Co. Dublin. Reprinted by De Burca rare books, 1982. .

External links
 http://www.ucc.ie/celt/published/T100005B/
 http://www.rootsweb.ancestry.com/~irlkik/ihm/connacht.htm#lui

10th-century Irish monarchs
Monarchs from County Mayo
964 deaths
Year of birth unknown